Roman Holiday is a 1987 American made-for-television romantic comedy film based on 1953 film of the same name.

Plot
The plot features Princess Elysa (Catherine Oxenberg), who is touring Rome, and decides to get 'out and about' away from her normal life. She meets an American reporter and his photographer, who show her the sights. The reporter at first is more interested in a story than in the princess, but he begins to fall for her.

Cast
 Catherine Oxenberg - Princess Elysa
 Tom Conti - Joe Bradley
 Ed Begley Jr. - Leonard Lupo
 Paul Daneman - King
 Eileen Atkins - Countess
 Patrick Allen - General
 Francis Matthews - Ambassador
 Shane Rimmer - Hogan
 Christopher Muncke - Phil
 Tessa Hood - Secretary
 Andrew Bicknell - Elite Guard (Squad Leader)
 David Rolfe - Major Domo

References

External links
 
 
 

1987 films
1987 television films
1987 romantic comedy films
Remakes of American films
American romantic comedy films
NBC network original films
Films about journalists
Films about royalty
Films scored by Mark Snow
Films set in Rome
1980s English-language films
Films directed by Noel Nosseck
1980s American films